Giuseppe Novelli (born 27 February 1959) is an Italian geneticist and the president of the University of Rome Tor Vergata.

Early life and career
Born in  Rossano in the south of Italy, he graduated magna cum laude in genetics at the University of Urbino in 1981. In 1985 earned a Ph.D at Sapienza University of Rome.
In 1995 he was appointed professor of genetics at the University of Rome Tor Vergata.

From 2003 he is also adjunct professor at Arkansas University.

From 2008 to 2011 he was president of the Faculty of Medicine and Surgery at Tor Vergata. In 2013 he was elected rector of his university.

References

1959 births
Living people
Italian geneticists
University of Urbino alumni
Sapienza University of Rome alumni
Academic staff of the University of Rome Tor Vergata
People from Rossano